Boettgeria is a genus of small, very elongate, air-breathing land snails, terrestrial pulmonate gastropod mollusks in the family Clausiliidae, the door snails, all of which have a clausilium.

This genus of door snails should not be confused with a genus of slugs that has a similar name: Boettgerilla Simroth, 1910.

Species
Species within the genus Boettgeria include: 
 Boettgeria crispa (Lowe, 1831)
 Boettgeria deltostoma  (Lowe, 1831)
 Boettgeria depauperata (Lowe, 1831)
 Boettgeria exigua (Lowe, 1831)
 Boettgeria jensi Neubert & Groh, 1998
 Boettgeria lorenziana Groh & Hemmen, 1984
 Boettgeria lowei Groh & Hemmen, 1984
 Boettgeria obesiuscula (Lowe, 1863)

References

 AnimalBase info at: 

 
Clausiliidae
Taxonomy articles created by Polbot